Apringius of Beja was a sixth-century Latin Church Father who wrote a commentary on the Book of Revelation. Only fragments of his commentary survive.

See also 
 List of Church Fathers

Notes

Further reading 
 Apringio de Beja.  Comentario al Apocalipsis de Apringio de Beja. Ed. Alberto del Campo Hernández. Institución San Jerónimo 25. Estella: Editorial Verbo Divino , 1991.  
 Gryson, Roger (ed.).  Commentaria minora in Apocalypsin Johannis. Corpus Christianorum, Series Latina 107. Turnhout: Brepols, 2003.
 Weinrich, William C. (ed.). Revelation. Ancient Christian Commentary on Scripture 12. Downers Grove, Illinois: InterVarsity Press, 2006.

Church Fathers
6th-century Latin writers
Portuguese saints